Urophora campestris is a species of tephritid or fruit flies in the genus Urophora of the family Tephritidae.

Distribution
Japan.

References

Urophora
Insects described in 1983
Diptera of Europe